The discography of Spanish pop rock band La Oreja de Van Gogh consists of eight studio albums, three live albums, two compilation albums, one extended play, one box set, thirty five singles and twenty six music videos. The band have sold over 8 million records worldwide, making them the best selling pop band in Spain and the country's most influential pop group since Mecano. La Oreja de Van Gogh released their debut studio album Dile Al Sol on May 18, 1998. It was a commercial success in Spain, eventually peaking at number 1 and being certified 7 times Platinum in the country. The band's second studio album, El viaje de Copperpot, was released on September 11, 2000. It is the band's most successful album in Spain; selling more than 1,200,000 copies there, becoming Sony's Spain second highest selling album in history. It also catapulted the band's fame and success in Latin America. The first three singles reached number 1 in Spain, Mexico and most Latin American countries.

La Oreja de Van Gogh's third album was releasead on April 28, 2003. Internationally, it is the most successful album of the band and it is said to be their consolidation album in the music industry. Like their previous work, its first three singles; "Puedes contar conmigo", "20 de Enero" and "Rosas" peaked #1 in Spain and most latinamerican charts. After three years, the band released their fourth album, Guapa and the extended play Más guapa, the last to feature Amaia Montero. The first single "Muñeca de Trapo" manage to reach #1 position on the Spanish and Mexican charts and while the rest of the singles reached high positions in Spain, they had modest impact in latinamerica. After the separation of former vocalist Amaia Montero, they released their first compilation album "LOVG: Grandes éxitos".

Their fifth studio album A las cinco en el Astoria featured new vocalist of the band Leire Martínez. Four singles were released from the album. The first, El Último Vals, had average success in Spain and latinamerica. The next year the band recorded a symphonic version of their greatest hits with the new vocalist, and released it under the name Nuestra casa a la izquierda del tiempo. On September 13, 2011 the band released Cometas por el cielo. The two first singles, "La Niña que Llora en tus Fiestas" and "Cometas por el Cielo", reached the top 20 in Spain and Latin America. Two live albums would be released in the five-year gap that followed before the next studio album: "Cometas Por el Cielo: En Difrecto Desde America" and "Primera Fila". Then in 2016 the band would release El planeta imaginario, which again topped the Spanish charts and reached number 2 in Mexico. Singles "Verano", "Diciembre", and "Estoy Contigo" were used to promote it. In 2020 the band released their eight studio album and Spanish chart-topper Un susurro en la tormenta, marking a milestone for vocalist Leire Martinez, who by then had reached the same number of studio albums released with the group as Amaia Montero, and had surpassed her in years as active part of the band.

Albums

Studio albums

Live albums

Box sets

Remix albums

Extended plays

Singles

As lead artist

As featured artist

Videography

Video albums

See also
List of best-selling albums in Spain

References

External links
La Oreja de Van Gogh official website

2003 singles
Discographies of Spanish artists
Songs written by Amaia Montero